Andrea Agrusti (born 30 August 1995 in Sassari) is an Italian racewalker. He competed at the 2020 Summer Olympics in 50 km walk.

Biography
He became interested with athletics after looking 2004 Olympic Games at television, but he started with sprint and doing also some basket. Then he specialised only in racewalking, with coach Marco Sanna in Sassari. He participated to his first 50 km walk in 2015.

With 6 National caps, he finished 11th at 2018 European Championships, 22nd at 2018 World Team Championships, 11th at 2017 European Cup and did not finished this race in 2019, then at his third attempt, he won the bronze medal at 2021 European Team Championships, with his personal best, qualifying him to the 2020 Olympics.

References

External links
 

Living people
1995 births
Italian male racewalkers
Athletics competitors of Fiamme Gialle
People from Sassari
Athletes (track and field) at the 2020 Summer Olympics
Olympic athletes of Italy
Sportspeople from Sardinia
21st-century Italian people